We Have Come for Your Parents is Amen's third album, produced by Ross Robinson and was released via Virgin Records. The album was mixed and engineered by Mike Fraser at The Warehouse in Vancouver, BC. The title of the album refers to The Dead Boys album We Have Come for Your Children.

Musical style
This album saw Amen continue the nu metal/hardcore punk blend that marked their entire career, as well as the political and socially-charged lyrics that were persistent in the band through the writings of Casey Chaos.

Promotion
A promotional audio cassette called PropAMENda was released in the United States in advance of the album by Virgin Records America in the Summer of 2000. The cassette contained two tracks: "Refuse Amen" and "PropAMENda (Excerpts From Forthcoming Album)", a 6-minute-long track featuring excerpts from the album.

The song, "The Price Of Reality", was released as an early single for the album, along with a promotional music video. The video itself depicted Casey Chaos re-creating Figure with Meat by Francis Bacon, along with various images of "Americana" such as Boy Scouts and girls in Sunday School outfits with axes. The video would later be released on the Streetwise DVD series in FYE in 2002.

Two more singles would be released after the album's release. "Too Hard to Be Free" would go on to reach Number 72 on the UK Official Chart on February 17, 2001, while "The Waiting 18" went on to be the highest ranking single, reaching Number 61 on the same chart on July 21, 2001.

Reception

We Have Come for Your Parents became Amen's most successful album, reaching Number 77 on the U.K. Charts on November 11, 2000, making it their breakout album in the United Kingdom. However, the album was largely unsuccessful in the US, where it did not chart and went on to sell 15,789 copies by 2002.

Reviews to the album were mixed to favorable. Victoria Seagle of NME wrote in her review, "There isn't a single hint of pantomime, no self-parodic angst. You doubt they know what Napster is, let alone give a damn. Instead, they just flip the hinge in their heads and let the Amen breakdown begin... Disgusted, frustrated, paranoid; it's hard to imagine what could help them with their minds. But as psycho therapy, 'We Have Come For Your Parents' is the pipe-bomb." In a less favorable review, Blabbermouth.net's  wrote, "Although AMEN should be credited for pursuing a style that has little in common with their Southern Californian counterparts, the group's tuneless, noisy approach gets tiresome very quickly, with Casey's obnoxious, high-pitched screaming proving to be more irritating than effective, in the process adding a touch of abrasiveness to the songs that is bound to turn off many a discriminating listener.

Punknews.org, in a 4.5 out of 5 star rating, wrote, "it is quite possibly one of the most angry, violent and frenetic albums released in the past ten years... Overall I think this album was quite possibly one of the most overlooked albums of the past few years."

Rock Sound voted We Have Come For Your Parents as the second best album of the year. Kerrang! voted it the sixth best album of the year. Metal Hammer picks "The Price of Reality" as best video of the year.

Other editions
A limited edition copy came out in Australia during the Big Day Out 2002. It includes the CD We Have Come for Your Parents and another CD with unedited songs from all the singles as well as a multimedia track on with a clip of "Too Hard To Be Free".

A deluxe version of the album was released in January 2013.

Track listing
All songs written by Casey Chaos.

Credits

Personnel
Casey Chaos - Vocals
Sonny Mayo - Guitar
Paul Fig - Guitar
John Fahnestock - Bass Guitar
Shannon Larkin - Drums

Production
Ross Robinson - production, mixing, mastering
Mike Frasier - engineer
Dean Karr - photography, layout

References

Amen (American band) albums
2000 albums
Albums produced by Ross Robinson
Virgin Records albums